Tyler Joe Miller is a Canadian country singer and songwriter. He is signed to MDM Recordings. He was the first independent artist to debut with back-to-back No. 1 hits on the Billboard Canada Country chart with "Pillow Talkin'" and "I Would Be Over Me Too".

Biography
Miller was born in Surrey, British Columbia. He liked acting when he was younger, before he began to play the guitar. In 2019, Miller won the BC Country Music Association's Ray McAuley Horizon Award. Miller cites Brad Paisley, Alan Jackson, Kenny Rogers, George Strait, and Garth Brooks as influences on his music.

On Christmas Day 2019, Miller released his debut single "Pillow Talkin'". The song reached No. 1 on the Billboard Canada Country chart, making Miller the first independently signed artist to top the chart with his debut single. It also became Miller's first Gold-certified single.

In June 2020, Miller released his second single "I Would Be Over Me Too". Miller was then selected as a semi-finalist in the SiriusXM Top of the Country competition. In October, "I Would Be Over Me Too" would also reach No. 1 on the Canada Country chart, handing Miller his second consecutive chart-topper, and first as a songwriter. In November 2020, Miller released his debut extended play Sometimes I Don't, But Sometimes I Do, which featured his first two singles as well as his the singles, "Fighting" and "Sometimes I Do". In November 2021, Miller was named the winner of the SiriusXM "Top of the Country" competition. He released the single "Wild as Her" in February 2022. He followed that up with the release of "Never Met a Beer" in August 2022, a collaboration with fellow Canadian country artist Matt Lang. In February 2023, he released the single "Back to Drinkin' Whiskey".

Personal life
Miller is a carpenter and painter by trade. He owns a non-profit organization called The Climb Outreach Society, which provides housing, drinking water sources, as well as emergency food funds and healthcare for newborn babies in Central and South America.

Discography

Extended plays

Singles

Music videos

Awards and nominations

References

External links

Living people
Canadian country singer-songwriters
Musicians from British Columbia
21st-century Canadian male singers
People from Surrey, British Columbia
Year of birth missing (living people)
Canadian male singer-songwriters